Duncan T. O'Brien (March 28, 1895 – September 14, 1938) was an American politician from New York.

Life
He was born on March 28, 1895 in New York City. He was an insurance broker, and entered politics as a Democrat.

He was a member of the New York State Senate (19th D.) from 1923 until his death in 1938, sitting in the 146th, 147th, 148th, 149th, 150th, 151st, 152nd, 153rd, 154th, 155th, 156th, 157th, 158th, 159th, 160th and 161st New York State Legislatures; and was Chairman of the Committee on Military Affairs from 1923 to 1924.

He died on September 14, 1938, of a cerebral hemorrhage; and was buried at Saint Raymond's Cemetery in the Throggs Neck section of the Bronx.

References
Duncan T. O'Brien at Political Graveyard

1895 births
1938 deaths
Democratic Party New York (state) state senators
20th-century American politicians
Burials at Saint Raymond's Cemetery (Bronx)